Mala Gora may refer to:

 Mała Góra, a hamlet in Poland
 Mala Gora, Croatia, a village near Pregrada
 Mala Gora, Kočevje, a settlement in the Municipality of Kočevje, Slovenia
 Mala Gora, Zreče, a settlement in the Municipality of Zreče, Slovenia